Deleted in azoospermia protein 2 is a protein that in humans is encoded by the DAZ2 gene.

This gene is a member of the DAZ gene family and is a candidate for the human Y-chromosomal azoospermia factor (AZF). Its expression is restricted to premeiotic germ cells, particularly in spermatogonia. It encodes an RNA-binding protein that is important for spermatogenesis. Four copies of this gene are found on chromosome Y within palindromic duplications; one pair of genes is part of the P2 palindrome and the second pair is part of the P1 palindrome. Each gene contains a 2.4 kb repeat including a 72-bp exon, called the DAZ repeat; the number of DAZ repeats is variable and there are several variations in the sequence of the DAZ repeat. Each copy of the gene also contains a 10.8 kb region that may be amplified; this region includes five exons that encode an RNA recognition motif (RRM) domain. This gene contains one copy of the 10.8 kb repeat. Alternative splicing results in multiple transcript variants encoding different isoforms.

References

Further reading